Rorschach is a constituency (Wahlkreis) in the canton of St. Gallen in Switzerland. Wahlkreis (SFOS number 1722) has been established on June 10, 2001, totalling 40,454 inhabitants on an area of 50.37 km². Rorschach is the capital of the Wahlkreis.

Demographics
Of the foreign population,, 764 are from Germany, 2,057 are from Italy, 2,910 are from ex-Yugoslavia, 553 are from Austria, 677 are from Turkey,  and 1,570 are from another country. Of the Swiss national languages, 33,615 speak German, 132 people speak French, 1,195 people speak Italian, and 52 people speak Romansh.

The age distribution, in Rorschach Wahlkreis is; 4,566 children or 11.9% of the population are between 0 and 9 years old and 4,854 teenagers or 12.6% are between 10 and 19.  Of the adult population, 4,415 people or 11.5% of the population are between 20 and 29 years old.  6,228 people or 16.2% are between 30 and 39, 5,589 people or 14.6% are between 40 and 49, and 4,927 people or 12.8% are between 50 and 59.  The senior population distribution is 3,531 people or 9.2% of the population are between 60 and 69 years old, 2,697 people or 7.0% are between 70 and 79, there are 1,368 people or 3.6% who are between 80 and 89, and there are 205 people or 0.5% who are between 90 and 99, and 2 people who are 100 or more.

 there were 5,628 persons (or 14.7% of the population) who were living alone in a private dwelling.  There were 9,045 (or 23.6%) persons who were part of a couple (married or otherwise committed) without children, and 20,134 (or 52.5%) who were part of a couple with children.  There were 2,018 (or 5.3%) people who lived in single parent home, while there are 229 persons who were adult children living with one or both parents, 191 persons who lived in a household made up of relatives, 277 who lived household made up of unrelated persons, and 860 who are either institutionalized or live in another type of collective housing.

Out of the total population in Rorschach Wahlkreis, the highest education level completed by 8,565 people (22.3% of the population) was Primary, while 14,783 (38.5%) have completed Secondary, 4,367 (11.4%) have attended a Tertiary school, and 1,548 (4.0%) are not in school.  The remainder did not answer this question.

Economy
 the average unemployment rate was 4.1%.

Religion
Of the rest of the population, there are 25 individuals (or about 0.07% of the population) who belong to the Christian Catholic faith, there are 1,054 individuals (or about 2.75% of the population) who belong to the Orthodox Church, and there are 1,031 individuals (or about 2.69% of the population) who belong to another Christian church. There are 13 individuals (or about 0.03% of the population) who are Jewish, and 2,177 (or about 5.67% of the population) who are Islamic. There are 152 individuals (or about 0.40% of the population) who belong to another church (not listed on the census), 2,978 (or about 7.76% of the population) belong to no church, are agnostic or atheist, and 789 individuals (or about 2.06% of the population) did not answer the question.

Municipalities 

See also 
 Municipalities of the canton of St. Gallen

References

External links

Constituencies of the canton of St. Gallen